Charlie's Cafe Exceptionale was a large and successful restaurant in downtown Minneapolis, Minnesota  from 1933 to its closing on July 21, 1982. It was located at 7th Street and 4th Avenue South and has been called Minneapolis's "most talked-about dining establishment" during its existence. It was owned and run by Charles Saunders until his death in 1964 (or 1962), and after that by his widow Louise Saunders until 1982.(Saunders' original partner was Charles "the Finn" Herlin, who died shortly after the restaurant opened.) Among the notable diners at the restaurant were Bob Hope, Jack Dempsey, and President Richard Nixon. The annual "Charlie Awards", honoring restaurants, restaurant dishes, and restaurant staff in the Twin Cities Minneapolis–Saint Paul metropolitan area of Minnesota are named after the restaurant.

In 1975 it had a capacity of 358-seats (221 in upstairs banquet rooms) and produced 320,000-meals-per-year, employed 175 people (with pay checks totaling more than $1 million each year in 1975 dollars) including 41 waitresses, 14 waiters, and four "captains". Its menu has been called "sophisticated-in-its-day", and "virtually everything" served was made "from scratch." The restaurant was known for its potato salad.

The restaurant featured a six-foot fountain statue of a water nymph (called "Scherzo", from an Italian musical term denoting a lilting happy movement) near its front doors, given to owner Charlies Sanders by a friend. (The bronze statue was done by Harriet Frishmuth).

References

Restaurants established in 1933
Restaurants disestablished in 1982
1933 establishments in Minnesota
1982 disestablishments in Minnesota
Buildings and structures in Minneapolis
Restaurants in Minnesota
Defunct restaurants in the United States